Horațiu Badiță (8 August 1976 – 11 June 2014) was a Romanian swimmer. He competed in the men's 4 × 100 metre freestyle relay event at the 1996 Summer Olympics. He died of a brain tumor.

References

External links
 

1976 births
2014 deaths
Olympic swimmers of Romania
Swimmers at the 1996 Summer Olympics
Place of birth missing
Deaths from brain cancer in Romania
Romanian male freestyle swimmers